Karl B. McEachron (November 17, 1889 in Hoosick Falls, New York – January 24, 1954 in Pittsfield, Massachusetts) was an American electrical engineer known for his contributions to high-voltage engineering. He received the 1949 AIEE Edison Medal (now IEEE Edison Medal) for "the advancement of electrical science in the field of lightning and other high voltage phenomena and for the application of this knowledge to the design and protection of electric apparatus systems". McEachron received also the 1935 Edward Longstreth Medal of the Franklin Institute.

McEachron received his B.S. in Electrical Engineering and Mechanical Engineering from Ohio Northern University in 1913 and M.S. from Purdue University in 1920.

External links
 Biography

References 

IEEE Edison Medal recipients
1889 births
1954 deaths
People from Hoosick Falls, New York
Ohio Northern University alumni
Purdue University alumni